Palmer is a surname of old English, Norman French, Scottish, German, and Catalan origin. One derivation is from the palm branch which was a token of a Christian pilgrimage to the Holy Land.

Notable people with the surname "Palmer" include

A
Abbie Palmer (born 1997), New Zealand squash player
Abiah W. Palmer (1835–1881), American politician
Abraham Palmer, American geneticist
Abraham J. Palmer (1847–1922), American physician
Abram Smythe Palmer (1844–1917), Irish lecturer
Acalus Lockwood Palmer (1820–1899), Canadian politician
Ada Palmer (born 1981), American historian
Adele Palmer (1915–2008), American costume designer
Adrian Palmer (born 1951), Scottish politician
Aiden Palmer (born 1987), English footballer
Aimee Palmer (born 2000), English footballer
Alan Palmer (1926–2022), British writer
A. Laurie Palmer, American artist
Alby Palmer (1885–1962), Australian rules footballer
Alex Palmer (born 1996), English footballer
Alexander Palmer (Australian politician) (1825–1901), Australian politician
Alf Palmer (1891–1981), Australian aboriginal
Alisa Palmer, Canadian theatre director
Allison R. Palmer (1927–2022), American paleontologist
Amanda Palmer (born 1976), American musician
Amanda Palmer (film executive) (born 1976), Australian film executive
Ambrose Palmer (1910–1990), Australian rules footballer
A. Mitchell Palmer, (1872–1936), American politician
Amy Palmer (born 1975), American hammer thrower
A. N. Palmer (1860–1927), American inventor
Anders Palmér (born 1960), Swedish footballer
Andre Francis Palmer, Trinidadian-American professor
Andy Palmer (born 1963), English engineer and businessman
Angela Palmer, Scottish artist
Àngels Cardona Palmer (born 1951), Spanish writer
Anna Palmer (born 1982), American journalist
Anna Campbell Palmer (1854–1928), American author
Anne Palmer (cricketer) (1915–2006), Australian cricketer
Ash Palmer (born 1992), English footballer
Archdale Palmer (1865–1950), British tennis player
Archdale Palmer (MP) (1661–1732), British politician
Archie Palmer (1896–1985), American academic administrator
Arnold Palmer (1929–2016), American golfer
Ashlee Palmer (born 1986), American football player
Ashley Palmer (actress) (born 1978), American actress
Audrey Palmer (1932–2007), Zimbabwean field hockey player
Austin Norman Palmer (1860–1927), American author

B
Barbara Palmer (1640–1709), English social figure
Barbara Jo Palmer (born 1949), American sports advocate
Barclay Palmer (1932–2020), British shot putter
Bascom H. Palmer (??–1916), American politician
Beaufort Palmer (1919–2011), Australian aviator
Becchara Palmer (born 1988), Australian beach volleyball player
Bee Palmer (1894–1967), American singer
Bell Elliott Palmer (1873–1947), American writer
Ben Palmer (born 1976), British television director
Benjamin Morgan Palmer (1818–1902), American minister
Beriah Palmer (1740–1812), American politician
Bernard Palmer (1914–1998), American author
Bert Palmer (1901–1932), New Zealand rugby union footballer
Bertha Palmer (1849–1918), American businesswoman
Beth Palmer (1952–2019), American bridge player
Betsy Palmer (1926–2015), American actress
Billy Palmer (1888–1957), English footballer
Billy Palmer (baseball), American baseball player
B. J. Palmer (1882–1961), American chiropractor
Blanca Palmer (born 1999), Spanish taekwondo athlete
Bo Palmer (born 1990), Canadian football player
Boris Palmer (born 1972), German politician
Brad Palmer (born 1961), Canadian ice hockey player
Bradley Palmer (1866–1946), American attorney
Briar Palmer (born 1995), New Zealand footballer
Brittney Palmer (born 1987), American model and ring girl
Bryan Palmer (1899–1990), Australian rugby union footballer
Bud Palmer (1921–2013), American basketball player
Byron Palmer (1920–2009), American actor

C
Caitriona Palmer (born 1972), Irish journalist
Calvin Palmer (1940–2014), English footballer
Camilla Palmer, British solicitor
Cammy Palmer (born 2000), Northern Irish footballer
Campbell Palmer (born 1936), Canadian boxer
Carl Palmer (born 1950), English musician
Carlton Palmer (born 1965), English footballer
Carlton Palmer (American football) (1895–??), American athletic coach
Carol Palmer, British anthropologist
Caroline Palmer, Canadian-American neuroscientist
Carson Palmer (born 1979), American football player
Cat Palmer, American photographer
Cecil Palmer (1873–1915), English cricketer
Charlotte Palmer (1762–1834), English teacher
Christene Palmer, Australian actress
Christopher Palmer (1946–1995), English composer
Clare Palmer (born 1967), British philosopher
Clarence Palmer (born 1943), American musician
Clayton Palmer (1885–1956), English cricketer
Clif Palmer (born 1937), Australian rules footballer
Clifford Palmer, New Zealand academic administrator
Clive Palmer (born 1954), Australian mining magnate
Clive Palmer (musician) (1943–2014), British musician
Cole Palmer (born 2002), English footballer
Colin A. Palmer (1944–2019), Jamaican-American historian
Corky Palmer (1954–2022), American baseball coach
Coral Palmer (born 1942), New Zealand netball player
Corliss Palmer (1899–1952), American actress
C. Phil Palmer, British paleontologist
Crawford Palmer (born 1970), French-American basketball player
Curtis Palmer (born 1977), New Zealand wheelchair rugby footballer
Cyril Palmer (1930–2013), Jamaican writer
Cyrus Maffet Palmer (1887–1959), American politician

D
Davinia Palmer, Welsh television presenter
Dean Palmer (born 1968), American baseball player
Debbie Palmer (1951–??), American disappeared child
Debbie Palmer (speed skater) (born 1973), British speed skater
Dee Palmer (born 1937), British musician
Deidre Palmer (born 1955/1956), Australian theologian
Del Palmer, English singer-songwriter
Derrell Palmer (1922–2009), American football player
Derrick Palmer (born 1988/1989), American labor organizer
Des Palmer (born 1931), Welsh footballer
Diana Palmer (author) (born 1946), American author
Dixeth Palmer (born 1968), Jamaican cricketer
Dominique Palmer (born 1999), British activist
Doris Palmer (1898–1993), New Zealand activist
Dorothea Palmer (1908–1992), English-Canadian criminal
Dorothy Binney Palmer (1888–1982), American explorer
Doug Palmer (1930–1992), Australian rules footballer
Douglas Palmer (born 1951), American politician

E
Earl Palmer (1924–2008), American drummer
Earl F. Palmer (born 1931), American minister
E. Clephan Palmer (1883–1954), British author
Edmund Palmer (1781–1834), English naval officer
Eduardo González Pálmer (1934–2022), Mexican footballer
Edwin Palmer (1824–1895), English churchman
Edwin Palmer (cricketer) (1869–1917), New Zealand cricketer
Edwina Palmer (born 1955), English professor
Eleanor Palmer (??–1558), English philanthropist
Elena Palmer, German journalist
Elihu Palmer (1794–1806), American minister
Elwin Palmer (1852–1906), British colonial administrator
Ely Palmer (1887–1977), American diplomat
Emily Palmer (??–1929), British politician
Ephraim Laurence Palmer (1888–1970), American conservationist
Erastus Dow Palmer (1817–1904), American sculptor
Errol Palmer (born 1945), American basketball player
Eustace Palmer, Sierra Leonian professor
Eve Palmer (1916–1998), South African writer

F
Fanny Purdy Palmer (1839–1923), American author
Farah Palmer (born 1972), New Zealand rugby union footballer
Felicity Palmer (born 1944), English operatic soprano
Fernando Garfella Palmer (1989–2020), Spanish filmmaker
Florence Margaret Spencer Palmer (1900–1987), British composer
Ford Palmer (born 1990), American runner
Freddie Palmer (1921–2020), French jockey
Fredrikke Palmer (1860–1947), Norwegian-American illustrator
Frida Palmer (1905–1966), Swedish astrononmer
F. W. J. Palmer (1864–1947), British engineer

G
Gail Palmer (born 1955), American film director
Garrick Palmer (born 1933), British painter
Gerry Palmer (1930–1984), Canadian football player
Gladys L. Palmer (1895–1967), American statistician
Gladys Milton Palmer (1884–1952), British film producer
Godfrey Palmer (1878–1933), English politician
Gordon Palmer (1918–1989), English aristocrat
Grace Palmer (born 1994), New Zealand actress
Graham Palmer (1921–1994), British canoeist
Greg Palmer (1947–2009), American television producer
Greg Palmer (Australian filmmaker) (1909–??), Australian filmmaker
Gregg Palmer (1927–2015), American actor
Gregory V. Palmer (born 1954), American bishop
Gretchen Palmer (born 1961), American actress

H
Haiden Palmer (born 1991), American basketball player
Hank Palmer (born 1985), Canadian sprinter
Hannah Borden Palmer (1843–1940), American activist and reformer
Hap Palmer (born 1942), American musician
Harlan G. Palmer (1885–1956), American politician and newspaper publisher
Harrison Palmer (born 1996), English cricketer
Harvard "Pete" Palmer Jr., American lobbyist
Hayley Palmer (born 1989), New Zealand swimmer
Helene Palmer (1928–2011), English actress
Hollie Palmer (born 2001), Australian footballer
Holly Palmer (born 1971), American singer-songwriter
Horace W. Palmer (1878–1953), American politician
Howard Palmer (1907–1969), Canadian curler
Howard Palmer (sailor) (born 1946), Barbadian sailor
Hubbel Palmer (born 1977), American screenwriter

I
Innis N. Palmer (1824–1900), American army general

J
Jackson Palmer (1867–1919), American politician
Jahkoy Palmer (born 1994), Canadian rapper
Jamie Palmer (born 1985), English footballer
Jane Palmer (born 1946), British author
Jared Palmer (born 1971), American tennis player
Jarod Palmer (born 1986), American ice hockey player
Jeffrey D. Palmer, American professor
Jemma Palmer (born 1986), American model
Jenny Palmer (born 1959), Northern Irish politician
Jermaine Palmer (born 1986), English footballer
Jerry Palmer (born 1943), American automotive designer
Jesse Palmer (born 1978), Canadian football player
Jesse Palmer (Australian footballer) (born 1996), Australian rules footballer
Jessica Palmer (born 1953), American author
Jessica Palmer (academic) (born 1980), New Zealand academic and lawyer
Jim Palmer (born 1945), American baseball player
Jim Palmer (basketball) (1933–2013), American basketball player
Jimmy Palmer (footballer) (1877–1947), Australian rules footballer
J. Lynn Palmer, American statistician
Jo Palmer (born 1971), Australian politician
Jock Palmer (1896–1964), Canadian soldier
Joel Palmer (1810–1881), Canadian-American pioneer and politician
Joey Palmer (1859–1910), Australian cricketer
Johnny Palmer (1918–2006), American golfer
Johnny Ace Palmer (born 1960), American magician
Jolyon Palmer (born 1991), British racing driver
Jonathan Palmer (born 1956), British racing driver
Jonathan Palmer (American football) (born 1983), American football player
Jordan Palmer (born 1984), American football player
Jordan Palmer (social activist), American politician and activist
Josh Palmer (born 1999), Canadian-American football player
Joshua Palmer (born 1991), Australian swimmer
Judith Palmer, American composer
Julia Palmer (??–1673), English poet
Julie Palmer, New Zealand professor
Juliet Palmer (born 1967), New Zealand composer
Julins Palmer (??–1556), English martyr
Julius A. Palmer Jr. (1840–1899), American historian
June Palmer (1940–2004), British model

K
Karl-Erik Palmér (1929–2015), Swedish footballer
Kasey Palmer (born 1996), English footballer
Kate Palmer, Australian sports administrator
Katherine Van Winkle Palmer (1895–1982), American paleontologist
Keegan Palmer (born 2003), Australian skateboarder
Keke Palmer (born 1993), American actress
Kelvin Palmer (born 1990), American football player
Ken Palmer (born 1937), British cricketer and cricket umpire
Kiki Palmer (1907–1949), Italian actress
King Palmer (1913–1999), English composer
Kirk Palmer (born 1986), Australian swimmer
Krysta Palmer (born 1992), American diver
Kye Palmer (born 1962), American musician
Kylie Palmer (born 1990), Australian swimmer

L
Lance Palmer (born 1987), American mixed martial artist
Larry Leon Palmer (1949–2021), American diplomat
Lawrence Palmer (born 1938), American ice hockey player
Lee Palmer (born 1970), English footballer
Leland Palmer (actress) (born 1941), American actress
Leon Palmer, American baseball player
Leonard Robert Palmer (1906–1984), British philologist
Les Palmer (1923–2006), American football player
Les Palmer (footballer, born 1923) (1923–2002), English footballer
Leslie Palmer (1910–1997), British water polo player
Leslie "Teacher" Palmer (born 1943), Trinidadian community activist
Lew Palmer (1875–1945), American football player
Liam Palmer (born 1991), English footballer
Lilli Palmer (1914–1986), German-American actress
Linwood E. Palmer Jr. (1921–2008), American politician
Lizzie Pitts Merrill Palmer (1838–1916), American philanthropist
Louis Palmer (born 1971), Swiss pioneer
Lovel Palmer (born 1984), Jamaican footballer
Lowell Palmer (born 1947), American baseball player
Lu Palmer (1922–2004), American reporter
Lucian H. Palmer (1855–1923), American politician
Luther Palmer (born 1949), American football player
Lynwood Palmer (1868–1941), English painter

M
Mabel Palmer (1876–1958), British-American suffragist
Mabel Heath Palmer (1885–1949), American chiropractor
Marcus Palmer (born 1988), English footballer
Margaret A. Palmer, American professor
Margaretta Palmer (1862–1924), American astronomer
Marguerite Palmer (1886–??), Irish activist
Maria Palmer (1917–1981), Austrian-American actress
Marilyn Palmer (born 1943), British historian
Marion Palmer (born 1953), Norwegian author
Martha Palmer, American computer scientist
Martin Palmer (born 1953), English theologian
Martin B. Palmer (1812–1893), Canadian politician
Mary Palmer (1716–1794), British author
Mary Palmer (born 1750) (1750–1820), British gentry
Maud Palmer (1858–1950), British activist
Max Palmer (1927–1984), American actor and wrestler
Melissa Palmer (born 1958), American hepatologist
Merle F. Palmer (1919–1990), American politician
Miguel Palmer (1942–2021), Mexican actor
Minnie Palmer (1857–1936), American actress
Miriam Augusta Palmer (1878–1977), American zoologist
Mitch Palmer (born 1973), American football player
Mixie Palmer (1927–2022), Irish Gaelic footballer
Monroe Palmer (born 1938), British politician

N
N. A. Palmer (born 1956), British musician
Nate Palmer (born 1989), American football player
Nathan Palmer (born 1989), American football player
Nathaniel Palmer (1799–1877), American sailor
Ned Palmer, British cheesemonger
Nettie Palmer (1885–1964), Australian literary figure
Nick Palmer (born 1950), British politician
Nick Palmer (rugby union) (born 1991), Australian rugby union footballer
Nigel F. Palmer (1946–2022), British professor
Noah Palmer (born 1983), American soccer player
Noel Palmer (1887–1961), British politician

O
Olle Palmer (born 1955), Swedish tennis player
Ollie Palmer (born 1992), English footballer
Orio Palmer (1956–2001), American fireman

P
Paige Palmer (1916–2009), American fitness expert
Pamela Palmer, American author
Parker Palmer (born 1939), American author
Patsy Palmer (born 1972), English actress
Pauline Palmer (1867–1938), American artist
Pedlar Palmer (1876–1949), English boxer
Peggy Palmer (born 1945), American politician
Pete Palmer (born 1938), American statistician
Phil Palmer (born 1952), British guitarist
Phoebe Palmer (1807–1874), American evangelist
Potter Palmer (1826–1902), American businessman and real estate developer

R
Randy Palmer (born 1975), American football player
R. E. A. Palmer (1933–2006), American historian
Reginald Palmer (1923–2016), Grenadian politician
Renzo Palmer (1929–1988), Italian actor
Rex Palmer (1896–1972), English broadcaster
Rhys Palmer (born 1989), Australian rules footballer
Rhys Palmer (cricketer) (born 1996), Jerseyian cricketer
Richmond Palmer (1877–1958), English barrister
Rissi Palmer (born 1981), American singer-songwriter
R. J. Palmer (born 1970), American politician
Rodney Palmer (1907–1987), English cricketer and soldier
Romal Palmer (born 1998), English footballer
Romie J. Palmer (1921–2014), American politician and jurist
Ronald D. Palmer (1932–2014), American diplomat
Ronnie Palmer (born 1986), American football player
Rory Palmer (born 1981), English politician
Rosina Palmer (1844–1932), Australian singer
Roundell Palmer (1812–1895), British politician
Rufus Palmer (1828–1873), Canadian physician
Ruth Palmer, British violinist

S
Santiago R. Palmer (1844–1906), Puerto Rican politician
Scot Palmer (1937–2022), Australian sports journalist
Sean Palmer (born 1973), American actor
Septimus Palmer (1858–1935), Australian cricketer
Shanique Palmer (born 1987), Jamaican communications consultant
Shaun Palmer (born 1968), American snowboarder
Shelly Palmer, American marketing consultant
Simon Palmer, English disc jockey
Singleton Palmer (1912–1993), American musician
Sophia French Palmer (1853–1920), American nurse
Spencer J. Palmer (1927–2000), American religious figure
Stanley Palmer, American historian
Stanley Palmer (artist) (born 1936), New Zealand artist
Stephanie Palmer, American consultant
Sterling Palmer (born 1971), American football player
Sue Palmer (born 1948), Scottish schoolteacher
Suetonia Palmer, New Zealand academic
Susan J. Palmer, Canadian sociologist
Sydney Bacon Palmer (1890–1954), English colonial administrator

T
Tenesha Palmer (born 1994), Trinidadian footballer
Teresa Palmer (born 1986), American actress
Tex Palmer (1904–1982), American actor
Theodore Sherman Palmer (1868–1955), American zoologist
Tobais Palmer (born 1990), American football player
Tracy Palmer (born 1967), English microbiologist
Trayvon Palmer (born 1994), American basketball player
Trey Palmer (born 2001), American football player
Tyler Palmer (born 1950), American alpine skier

V
Valentine Palmer (1935–2022), British voice coach
Vance Palmer (1885–1959), Australian author
Vernon Valentine Palmer, American legal scholar
Victoria Palmer (born 1945), American tennis player
Violet Palmer (born 1964), American basketball referee
Virginia E. Palmer (born 1963), American diplomat

W
Wendy Palmer (born 1974), American basketball player
Willard Palmer (1917–1996), American musician
Williston B. Palmer (1899–1973), American general
Winthrop Palmer (1906–1970), American ice hockey player

Z
Zirl A. Palmer (1920–1982), American businessman
Zoe Palmer (1903–1983), British actress
Zoie Palmer, Canadian actress

Disambiguation pages

A
Albert Palmer (disambiguation)
Alfred Palmer (disambiguation)
Alice Palmer (disambiguation)
Andrew Palmer (disambiguation)
Anthony Palmer (disambiguation)
Arthur Palmer (disambiguation)

B
Barry Palmer (disambiguation)
Brian Palmer (disambiguation)
Bruce Palmer (disambiguation)

C
Catherine Palmer (disambiguation)
Charles Palmer (disambiguation)
Chris Palmer (disambiguation)

D
Daniel Palmer (disambiguation)
David Palmer (disambiguation)
Derek Palmer (disambiguation)
Dick Palmer (disambiguation)
Don Palmer (disambiguation)

E
Eddie Palmer (disambiguation)
Edward Palmer (disambiguation)
Elizabeth Palmer (disambiguation)
Eric Palmer (disambiguation)
Ernest Palmer (disambiguation)
Eugene Palmer (disambiguation)

F
Francis Palmer (disambiguation)
Frank Palmer (disambiguation)
Frederick Palmer (disambiguation)

G
Gary Palmer (disambiguation)
Geoffrey Palmer (disambiguation)
George Palmer (disambiguation)
Gerald Palmer (disambiguation)
Glenn Palmer (disambiguation)
Grant Palmer (disambiguation)

H
Harold Palmer (disambiguation)
Harry Palmer (disambiguation)
Helen Palmer (disambiguation)
Henry Palmer (disambiguation)
Herbert Palmer (disambiguation)

I
Ian Palmer (disambiguation)

J
Jack Palmer (disambiguation)
James Palmer (disambiguation)
Jason Palmer (disambiguation)
John Palmer (disambiguation)
Joseph Palmer (disambiguation)

K
Keith Palmer (disambiguation)
Kevin Palmer (disambiguation)

L
Lillian Palmer (disambiguation)
Lou Palmer (disambiguation)

M
Mark Palmer (disambiguation)
Matt Palmer (disambiguation)
Michael Palmer (disambiguation)

N
Norman Palmer (disambiguation)

P
Patrick Palmer (disambiguation)
Paul Palmer (disambiguation)
Peter Palmer (disambiguation)
Philip Palmer (disambiguation)

R
Ralph Palmer (disambiguation)
Ray Palmer (disambiguation)
Richard Palmer (disambiguation)
Rob Palmer (disambiguation)
Robert Palmer (disambiguation)
Roger Palmer (disambiguation)
Roy Palmer (disambiguation)
Ryan Palmer (disambiguation)

S
Samuel Palmer (disambiguation)
Sandra Palmer (disambiguation)
Sarah Palmer (disambiguation)
Scott Palmer (disambiguation)
Shirley Palmer (disambiguation)
Stephen Palmer (disambiguation)
Stuart Palmer (disambiguation)

T
Terry Palmer (disambiguation)
Thomas Palmer (disambiguation)
Tim Palmer (disambiguation)
Tony Palmer (disambiguation)

W
Walter Palmer (disambiguation)
William Palmer (disambiguation)

Fictional characters
Annie Palmer, a character on the soap opera EastEnders
Diana Palmer (The Phantom), a character in the comic series The Phantom
Laura Palmer, a character on the television series Twin Peaks
Leland Palmer, a character on the television series Twin Peaks

See also
Attorney General Palmer (disambiguation), a disambiguation page for Attorney Generals surnamed "Palmer"
Admiral Palmer (disambiguation), a disambiguation page for Admirals surnamed "Palmer"
General Palmer (disambiguation), a disambiguation page for Generals surnamed "Palmer"
Justice Palmer (disambiguation), a disambiguation page for Justices surnamed "Palmer"
Senator Palmer (disambiguation), a disambiguation page for Senators surnamed "Palmer"

References 

English-language surnames
Occupational surnames
English-language occupational surnames